Sverke Lorgen (born 20 July 1973) is a Norwegian rower. He competed in the men's coxless pair event at the 1992 Summer Olympics.  He graduated from Harvard University.

References

External links
 

1973 births
Living people
Norwegian male rowers
Olympic rowers of Norway
Rowers at the 1992 Summer Olympics
Place of birth missing (living people)
Harvard Crimson rowers